Fıstıklı (Turkish for with nuts or place with nuts) may refer to:

 Fıstıklı, Armutlu, a village in the province of Yalova, Turkey
 Fıstıklı, Artvin, a village in the province of Artvin, Turkey
 Fıstıklı, Kahta, a village in the province of Adıyaman, Turkey
 Fıstıqlı, a village and municipality in the Qakh district of Azerbaijan